Sven Bender (born 27 April 1989) is a German former professional footballer who played as a central defender and defensive midfielder. He was raised in Brannenburg and started his football career playing for TSV Brannenburg. Sven is the twin brother of Lars Bender.

Club career

Early career
Bender played from 1993 to 1999 in the youth of the TSV Brannenburg. From 1999 to 2002, he was part of SpVgg Unterhaching youth teams. In summer 2002, Bender moved to the 1860 München youth team.

1860 Munich
He started his football career on the U-14 team and played for all of 1860 München's youth teams in three years. In November 2007, Bender extended his contract with the club until 2011. In 2009, Munich had to sell both Lars and Sven Bender, due to club's financial problem. Sven moved to Borussia Dortmund and Lars to Bayer Leverkusen. Sven played 65 games and scored 1 goal for 1860 Munich. In 2009, he joined Borussia Dortmund, where he signed a contract that tied him to the club until 2013.

Borussia Dortmund
Bender made his Bundesliga debut on 19 September 2009 in a game against Hannover 96. His biggest rival for the spot in the defensive midfield suffered several injuries and Bender established himself in the starting eleven very quickly. He scored his first Bundesliga goal on 12 February 2011 against 1. FC Kaiserslautern and extended his contract until 2017. The years 2011 and 2012 were very successful for Bender, as he was an important player in Borussia Dortmund's midfield and helped the team win the national championship in both years as well as the DFB-Pokal in 2012. On 6 January 2013, Bender extended his contract with Dortmund, keeping him at the club until 2017. During the 2012–13 season, he was struggling with several injuries which made Dortmund sign Nuri Şahin in January 2013. After treatment of his injury, Bender got another opponent for his position. He was on his way to becoming the number one player on his position and shared a place with team's captain Sebastian Kehl and helped the team to reach 2013 UEFA Champions League Final, although they were defeated by their domestic rivals Bayern Munich. On 27 July 2013, Bender won the 2013 DFL-Supercup with Dortmund 4–2 against Bayern Munich. In February 2014, he suffered injury after a loss against Hamburger SV, which eventually ruled him out for the rest season. On 21 February 2016, Bender signed a contract extension to keep him at the club until 2021.

Bayer Leverkusen
On 13 July 2017, Bender ended his eight-year tenure at Borussia Dortmund with 158 Bundesliga matches, signing a four-year contract with Bayer Leverkusen until 2021 and reuniting with his brother Lars. Both Benders announced retirement from football after the end of the 20/21 season.

International career

At the under-19 level, Bender was a part of the team that won the 2008 European Under-19 Championship. He and his twin brother Lars were named jointly as players of the tournament. Bender made his debut for the senior team in a friendly match against Australia in March 2011. He appeared in several more friendly games and nominated for the Euro 2012 but did not make the squad's final. In February 2014, Bender suffered an Osteitis pubis injury that ruled him out for the 2014 FIFA World Cup. His last internationals therefore were two friendlies in late 2013. In mid-July on 2016, despite not being called up for the senior team since 2013, he made the spot for Germany Olympic football team for the 2016 Summer Olympics as one of three over 23 years old players along with his brother and Nils Petersen, where Germany won the silver medal.

Coaching career
In June 2022, the German Football Association appointed him as the new assistant coach of the Germany U-16 national team.

Career statistics

Club

Personal life
On 20 June 2015, Bender married Simone Dettendorfer, his long time girlfriend since 2008.

Honours
Borussia Dortmund
Bundesliga: 2010–11, 2011–12
DFB-Pokal: 2011–12, 2016–17
DFL-Supercup: 2013, 2014
 UEFA Champions League runner-up: 2012–13
Germany
UEFA European Under-19 Championship: 2008
Summer Olympic Games: Silver Medal, 2016
Individual
Fritz Walter Medal U17 Bronze Medal 2006
UEFA European Under-19 Football Championship Golden Player: 2008

References

External links
Official Website of Sven Bender

Kicker profile 
Bundesliga profile

1989 births
Living people
German twins
People from Rosenheim
Sportspeople from Upper Bavaria
Footballers from Bavaria
Association football midfielders
German footballers
Germany international footballers
Germany youth international footballers
Bundesliga players
2. Bundesliga players
3. Liga players
Regionalliga players
TSV 1860 Munich II players
TSV 1860 Munich players
Borussia Dortmund players
Borussia Dortmund II players
Bayer 04 Leverkusen players
Twin sportspeople
Footballers at the 2016 Summer Olympics
Olympic footballers of Germany
Medalists at the 2016 Summer Olympics
Olympic silver medalists for Germany
Olympic medalists in football